The Repligen Award in Chemistry of Biological Processes was established in 1985 and consists of a silver medal and honorarium. Its purpose is to acknowledge and encourage outstanding contributions to the understanding of the chemistry of biological processes, with particular emphasis on structure, function, and mechanism. The Award is administered by the Division of Biological Chemistry of the American Chemical Society. 

The award was suspended in 2018 until a patron can be found.

Recipients
Source: ACS - Division of Biological Chemistry

1986 – Gregorio Weber
1987 – Thomas C. Bruice
1988 – Robert H. Abeles
1989 – Stephen J. Benkovic
1990 – Harold A. Scheraga
1991 – William W. Parson
1992 – Frank H. Westheimer
1993 – Jeremy R. Knowles
1994 – Judith P. Klinman
1995 – W. Wallace Cleland
1996 – William P. Jencks
1997 – James A. Spudich
1998 – David S. Eisenberg
1999 – Christopher T. Walsh
2000 – Perry A. Frey
2001 – Rowena G. Matthews
2002 – C. Dale Poulter
2003 – John A. Gerlt
2004 – JoAnne Stubbe
2005 – David E. Cane
2006 – Vern L. Schramm
2007 – Michael Marletta
2008 – Hung-Wen (Ben) Liu
2009 – Frank Raushel
2010 – Ronald T. Raines
2011 – Richard Armstrong
2012 – Carol Fierke
2013 – David W. Christianson
2014 – John Lipscomb
2015 – John S. Blanchard
2016 – Tadhg Begley
2017 – Wilfred A. van der Donk
2018 – Michael H. Gelb
 award suspended - 2018

See also

 List of biochemistry awards

References

External links 
 Division of Biological Chemistry, Chemical Society

Biochemistry awards